Claire Chicha is a French-Korean singer-songwriter, known by her stage name Spill Tab (stylized as spill tab). An alternative pop artist, she has been noted by music media outlets for her lo-fi vocals and sound.

Early life
Chicha has spent time growing up in Paris, Los Angeles, and Bangkok.

Career

Tour managing and Oatmilk (2019–2020)
Based in Los Angeles, Chicha first ventured into the music industry working as an A&R intern, and merchandise manager for her close friend Gus Dapperton. Shortly after, her music began gaining some traction at the beginning of the COVID-19 pandemic. In December 2020, she released the track "name" and its accompanying music video, in addition to her debut EP Oatmilk. The EP features production work from David Marinelli, her main collaborator.

Bonnie and emerging popularity (2021–present)
In January 2021, NME included her on their "NME 100" list highlighting emerging artists. Later in the year, the publication would write a profile on her as part of their Breakout series covering emerging artists.

In April, she released the single "Anybody Else". She featured on Posse EP Vol. 1, a collaborative EP by Metronomy. In December, she released the EP Bonnie. It featured collaborations with Gus Dapperton, Jawny, and Tommy Genesis. The EP was originally set to release in October. A music video for "Velcro" featuring Dappteron was released the following February.

Chicha's profile increased in 2022, during which she was often touring. In January, Complex highlighted her as an artist "to watch in 2022". In March and May she released the singles "Sunburn" and "Splinter", respectively. The Fader included the latter among the their monthly listing of top rock songs. She partnered with American Eagle Outfitters for their "Back-to-School" campaign on the TikTok SoundOn platform. In October, Chicha was announced as a performer for the 2023 SXSW festival. In their announcement, SXSW called spill tab one of 2022's "buzziest artists." Chicha has previously performed for French brands Hermés and YSL. She performed in August for the latter's live sessions at Saint Laurent Rive Droite. In November, she released the single "Crème Brûlée". Also in November, Chicha featured on Mac Wetha's "Play Pretend" track. A further release in January 2023 was the single "Borderline Insane" featuring Matilda Mann.

Musical style
Featuring a "lo-fi sound and stripped-down production", Chicha's music has been described by media outlets as "alt-pop" and "bedroom pop". Chicha's inspirations include Remi Wolf, Caroline Polachek, and Hiatus Kaiyote.

The Washington Posts Anying Guo has written that Chicha and Marinelli go beyond "run-of-the-mill bedroom pop", with Chicha quiet and often-layered vocals "[slicing] through dreamy, electro-dance ready introspections.}} Marinelli's production on spill tab tracks fuse various genres such as R&B and electro-pop. Brenton Blanchet of Complex has called Chicha’s music "undeniably sticky", describing her brand of pop as "vocal-layered, sunny-yet-sometimes-angsty, and melody-fueled." A French-Korean, Chicha often sings in French, such as on "Calvaire". Chicha also plays the guitar and ukelele.

Notes

References

French expatriates in the United States
French singer-songwriters
Korean expatriates in the United States
Korean people of French descent
Korean singers
Korean songwriters
Singer-songwriters from California
Women pop singers
21st-century French singers
21st-century Korean people